Margarinotus umbrosus is a species of clown beetle in the family Histeridae. It is found in Western North America, from central California to British Columbia in the north and eastward to Montana and Alberta. It has been recorded from dung, carrion, and decaying vegetation.

References

Further reading

 
 
 
 
 
 
 
 

Histeridae
Beetles of North America
Beetles described in 1893
Taxa named by Thomas Lincoln Casey Jr.